The Enchantress of Florence is the ninth novel by Salman Rushdie, published in 2008. According to Rushdie this is his "most researched book" which required "years and years of reading".

The novel was published on 11 April 2008 by Jonathan Cape London, and in the United States by Random House.

Plot outline
The central theme of The Enchantress of Florence is the visit of a European to the Mughal emperor Akbar's court and his claim that he is a long lost relative of Akbar, born of an exiled Indian princess and an Italian from Florence. The story moves between continents, the court of Akbar to Renaissance Florence mixing history, fantasy and fable.

Part one
The tale of adventure begins in Fatehpur Sikri, the capital of Mughal emperor Akbar the Great, when a stranger arrives, having stowed away on a pirate ship captained by the Scottish Lord Hauksbank, and sets the Mughal court talking and looking back into its past.

Part two
The stranger begins to tell Akbar the tale, going back to the boyhood of three friends in Florence, Il Machia, Ago Vespucci and Nino Argalia, the last of whom became an adventurer in the East.

Part three
The tale returns to the mobs and clamour of Florence in the hands of the Medici dynasty.

An eight-page bibliography follows the end of the story.

Major themes
The book relates a succession of interweaving stories by a variety of storytellers, travellers and adventurers and of course touches on the histories and cultures of the various settings including the Mughal and Ottoman Empires, the earlier Mongols, and Renaissance Florence. There is a strong theme of sex and eroticism, much of it surrounding the Enchantress of the book's title, who was inspired by the Renaissance poem Orlando Furioso. There is also a recurring discussion of humanism and debate as opposed to authoritarianism, and Machiavelli is a character in the book. Like Rushdie's previous works, the book can be considered a work of magic realism.

Fictional characters
Qara Köz, Lady Black Eyes, whom Rushdie cites as having been inspired by the (fictional) character Angelica in the epic poem Orlando innamorato.
Hauksbank – fictional character may be based on Sir John Hawkwood, an English mercenary or condottiero in 14th-century Italy.

Historical characters

Mughal Empire
Akbar the Great – Mughal emperor
Maham Anaga – wet nurse of the Mughal Emperor Akbar. She was the de facto regent of the Mughal state after the exclusion of Bairam Khan in 1560 to Akbar's assumption of full power in 1562, shortly before her death.
Jodha Bai – Empress consort and favorite wife of Akbar, mother of prince Salim
Adham Khan – Akbar's foster brother
Babar – founder of the Mughal Empire, brother of Angelica
Qutlugh Nigar Khanum – Babar's mother
Khanzada Begum – Babar's sister
Humayun – second Mughal Emperor, father of Akbar 
Gulbadan – daughter of Babar, sister of Humayun, aunt of Akbar 
Prince Khusraw – son of Prince Salim (Jahangir), grandson of Akbar 
Abu'l-Fazl – Akbar's chief advisor and author of Akbarnama, one of the Navaratnas, the nine gems in Akbar's court. He was originally Persian.
Birbal – Grand Vizier (Wazīr-e Azam) of the Mughal court in the administration of the Mughal emperor Akbar, also one of the nine gems
Miyan Tansen – Legendary musician, well known for his voice and music
Ali-Shir Nava'i – poet of Herat, author of "My Dark Eyed One"
Mir Sayyid Ali – first master of Akbar's royal art studio

Safavid dynasty
Shah Ismail – Shah from 1501 to 1524 and victor of the battle of Marv, Turkmenistan

Ottoman Empire
Sultan Mehmed II – Sultan of the Ottoman Empire for a short time from 1444 to 1446, and later from 1451 to 1481. He conquered Constantinople, bringing an end to the medieval Byzantine Empire.
Bayezid II – Sultan of the Ottoman Empire from 1481 to 1512
Selim I  "the Grim" – son of Bayezid II and Sultan of the Ottoman Empire from 1512 to 1520
Janissaries – infantry units that formed the Ottoman sultan's household troops and bodyguards

Western
Amerigo Vespucci – explorer and cartographer after whom the Americas are named
Niccolò Machiavelli – Italian diplomat, political philosopher, musician, poet and playwright
Andrea Doria – Genoese admiral
Giuliano de' Medici – reigned in Florence from 1512 to 1516
Lorenzo de' Medici – Florentine ruler of Florence, died from syphilis; Niccolò Machiavelli dedicated "The Prince" to Lorenzo
Savonarola – Italian Dominican priest and leader of Florence from 1494 until his execution in 1498

Other
Shaybani Khan (Wormwood) - Uzbek leader and descendant of Genghis Khan
Vlad III, Prince of Wallachia (1448; 1456–1462; 1476); called "Vlad the Impaler"

Critical reception
Writing in The Guardian, Ursula K. Le Guin called it a "brilliant, fascinating, generous novel", and praised its "glamour and power, its humour and shock, its verve, its glory".

References

External links
Transcript of interview of Salman Rushdie with Ramona Koval on The Book Show, ABC Radio National 21 April 2007.
Salman Rushdie in conversation with Jeffrey Eugenides about The Enchantress of Florence at LIVE from the New York Public Library, 27 June 2008.

2008 British novels
Novels by Salman Rushdie
British magic realism novels
Cultural depictions of Akbar
Cultural depictions of Tansen
Cultural depictions of Mehmed the Conqueror
Cultural depictions of Niccolò Machiavelli
Cultural depictions of Girolamo Savonarola
Cultural depictions of Lorenzo de' Medici
Cultural depictions of Vlad the Impaler
Mughal Empire in fiction
Novels set in the Ottoman Empire
Novels set in Florence
Fatehpur Sikri